The 2022–23 Hrvatski telekom Premijer liga is the 32nd season of the HT Premijer liga, the top-tier professional basketball league in Croatia.

Format 
The league consists of 12 teams. The first half of the season will be played by a two-round system, while the teams in the second half of the season will be divided into two groups; Championship Round ( will consist of the top six teams from the first half of the season, while Relegation and Promotion Round will consist of the remaining six teams from the first half of the season.

The top four teams of Championship Round will secure a spot in the playoffs semifinals.

Current teams

Promotion and relegation 

 Team promoted from the First League

 Dinamo Zagreb (First League champion)

 Bosco

 Team relegated to the First League

 Vrijednosnice Osijek
 Sonik Puntamika

Venues and locations 

NOTE: Vrijednosnice Osijek although relegated to the First League also plays in the 2022–23 Second Adriatic League.

Croatian clubs in European competitions

References

External links 

 Official website
 Eurobasket.com league page

A-1 Liga seasons
Croatian
2022–23 in Croatian basketball